Cargilfield Preparatory School is a private co-educational prep school in Edinburgh, Scotland. It was founded in 1873. It is a day and boarding school for boys and girls aged 3–13 and caters for approximately 300 pupils. It prepares pupils mainly for Common Entrance Examinations or Academic Scholarships required for entry to public schools.

History

Cargilfield was founded in 1873 by Rev Daniel Charles Darnell an Episcopalian and a former master at Rugby School and was the first independent preparatory school in Scotland. Originally, the school was located at Cargilfield, a large villa on South Trinity Road in the Trinity area of Edinburgh. It was sometimes referred to as Cargilfield Trinity School. It largely served as a feeder school to nearby Fettes College.

In 1899, the school relocated to Barnton.

In the period 2003–2012, the headmaster was John Elder. Among the changes he made to the school was the abolition of homework.

In 2014, the UK government named the school in a list of 25 UK employers which had failed to pay workers the national minimum wage, for underpaying an artist in residence by £3,739. The school responded that it had rectified this situation as soon as it was made aware of it, and apologised.

The school has reached the finals of the UKMT Team Mathematics Challenge competition in five consecutive years (2013,
2014,

2015,

2016, and 

2017.
)

Notable alumni
See also :Category:People educated at Cargilfield School
Torquhil Campbell, 13th Duke of Argyll (born 1968)
James Balfour-Melville (1882–1915), cricketer and soldier
Robin Barbour KCVO MC (1921–2014), Church of Scotland minister and author
John Lorne Campbell of Canna (1906-1996) landowner and folklorist
Alan Archibald Campbell-Swinton (1863–1930), electrical engineer
Euan Hillhouse Methven Cox (1893–1977), botanist and horticulturist
George Denholm (1908–1997), Second World War flying ace
Thomas Gillespie (1892–1914), Olympic rower
Sandy Gunn, photographic reconnaissance Spitfire pilot, executed in 1944 after the Great Escape
Sir William Oliphant Hutchison (1889–1970), portrait and landscape painter
Douglas Jamieson, Lord Jamieson (1880–1952), Unionist politician and judge
Logie Bruce Lockhart (1921–2020), Scotland international rugby union footballer and headmaster
Hugh Mackenzie (1913–1996), Royal Navy officer
Donald M. MacKinnon (1913–1994), philosopher and theologian
Sir Thomas Stewart Macpherson (1920–2014), soldier
Duncan Menzies, Lord Menzies (born 1953), judge of the Supreme Courts of Scotland
Victor Noel-Paton, Baron Ferrier (1900–1992), soldier and business man
William Robert Ogilvie-Grant (1863–1924), ornithologist
Lewis Robertson (1883–1914), Scotland rugby footballer and soldier
William Roy Sanderson DD (1907–2008), minister, Moderator of the General Assembly of the Church of Scotland in 1967
Sir Samuel Strang Steel of Philiphaugh Bt, landowner and Conservative politician.
George Younger, 4th Viscount Younger of Leckie (1931-2003), Conservative politician and banker

References

External links
 Official Website
 Profile on the Independent Schools Council website
 

Private schools in Edinburgh
Category B listed buildings in Edinburgh
1873 establishments in Scotland
Educational institutions established in 1873
Preparatory schools in Scotland
Listed schools in Scotland
Boarding schools in Edinburgh